Pommerit-Jaudy is a former commune in the Côtes-d'Armor department of Brittany in northwestern France. On 1 January 2019, it was merged into the new commune La Roche-Jaudy.

Geography

Climate
Pommerit-Jaudy has a oceanic climate (Köppen climate classification Cfb).

Population

Inhabitants of Pommerit-Jaudy are called pommeritains in French.

See also
Communes of the Côtes-d'Armor department

References

External links

Former communes of Côtes-d'Armor